Third Earth may refer to:

A planet in the ThunderCats franchise
A territory in the Pendragon series
"3rd Earth" (alternatively spelled "Third Earth"), a 2003 song by Scott Bond and Solarstone